This is a list of gross domestic product (GDP) at purchasing power parity (PPP) for the latest years recorded in the CIA World Factbook. All sovereign states with United Nations membership and territory in either Asia or Oceania are included on the list apart from those who are also members of the Council of Europe. In addition, the list includes the special administrative regions of China (Hong Kong and Macao).  All dependent territories (including those under the control of states on this list) are excluded. The figures provided are quoted in US dollars and are 2016 estimates unless otherwise noted.

Central Asia

East Asia

South Asia

South East Asia (SEA)

Persian Gulf

Pacific

Asia-Pacific region

Asia Regionwise GDP Per Capita

See also
 Economy of Asia
 World economy

References

GDP with PPP
Asian and Pacific
GDP with PPP
GDP with PPP
PPP GDP with Asia
Asia and Oceania PPP GDP
Lists of countries in Oceania